Robert Maxwell Dudgeon, CBE, DSO, MC, JP (20 February 1881 – 6 November 1962) was a Scottish soldier and policeman.

The eldest son of  Colonel Robert Francis Dudgeon, CB, he was educated at Uppingham School and Loretto School. Following nomination from the Authorities of Public Schools, he was commissioned into the Queen's Own Cameron Highlanders as a second lieutenant on 5 January 1901. 

He saw active service with the 1st Battalion of his regiment in South Africa, during the Second Boer War. After the war ended in June 1902, Dudgeon and other men of the 1st battalion left Cape Town in the SS Dunera in late September 1902, arriving at Southampton early the following month. He went on to become Brigadier-General before he retired in 1920.

From 1920 to 1930, he was Governor of HM Prison Edinburgh; and from 1930 to 1945 Chief Inspector of Constabulary for Scotland.

Notes

Recipients of the Military Medal
1962 deaths
1881 births
Chief Inspectors of Constabulary (Scotland)
Law enforcement in Scotland
Knights Bachelor
Companions of the Distinguished Service Order
People educated at Loretto School, Musselburgh
People educated at Uppingham School
Commanders of the Order of the British Empire
Queen's Own Cameron Highlanders officers
British prison governors
British Army brigadiers